Phytoecia plasoni is a species of beetle in the family Cerambycidae. It was described by Ganglbauer in 1884. It is known from Turkey, Armenia and Iran.

References

Phytoecia
Beetles described in 1884